Yağmur Koçyiğit (born September 7, 1988 in İstanbul) is a Turkish volleyball player. She plays for Fenerbahçe and signed a three-year contract with the team in July 2010. She has also played for Jamper Aguere from Spain, Eczacıbaşı Zentiva and Beşiktaş from Turkey.

Koçyiğit won the bronze medal at the 2010–11 CEV Champions League with Fenerbahçe.

Awards

Clubs
 2010 Turkish Super Cup -  Champion, with Fenerbahçe.
 2010 FIVB World Club Championship -  Champion, with Fenerbahçe.
 2010-11 CEV Champions League -  Bronze medal, with Fenerbahçe
 2010-11 Aroma Women's Volleyball League -  Champion, with Fenerbahçe.
 2011-12 CEV Champions League -  Champion, with Fenerbahçe

See also
 Turkish women in sports

References

External links
 CEV Profile
 Fenerbahce Official Page

1988 births
Living people
Volleyball players from Istanbul
Turkish women's volleyball players
Fenerbahçe volleyballers
Eczacıbaşı volleyball players
Beşiktaş volleyballers
Turkish expatriate volleyball players
Turkish expatriate sportspeople in Spain
21st-century Turkish women